Ramón Ayala (Ramón Covarrubias Garza, born 1945) is a Mexican Norteño singer and accordion player.

Ramón Ayala may also refer to:
 
 Ramón Ayala (accordion player), (born 1928) Mexican accordion player
 Ramón Ayala (Argentine musician), (born 1937) Argentine singer and poet  
 Ramón Ayala Rodríguez, (born 1976) birth name of Puerto Rican musician Daddy Yankee
 Ramón Ayala (judoka), (born 1979) Puerto Rican judoka